Legislative elections were held in South West Africa on 21 February 1940. The whites-only election saw a victory for the United National South West Party, which won 10 of the 12 elected seats in the Legislative Assembly.

Electoral system
The Legislative Assembly had 18 seats, of which twelve were elected in single-member constituencies, and six were appointed by the territory's Administrator, David Gideon Conradie. The twelve constituencies were Gibeon, Gobabis, Grootfontein, Keetmanshoop, Luderitz, Okahandja, Otjiwarongo, Stampriet, Swakopmund, Warmbad, Windhoek Central and Windhoek District.

Results
Two seats, Gibeon and Windhoek District, were won unopposed by the United National South West Party. Of the six members appointed by Administrator, all were from the United National South West Party.

References

South West Africa
1940 in South West Africa
Elections in Namibia
Election and referendum articles with incomplete results